Keep Not Silent (translit. Et Sheaava Nafshi) is a 2004 Israeli documentary film directed and produced by Ilil Alexander about three lesbians in Jerusalem. Ilil had just graduated from Tel-Aviv University Film School.

It opened the San Francisco Jewish Film Festival in 2004. It won the Israeli Academy award for Best Documentary Film 2004  and won numerous international awards in film festivals in Europe, North America, and the Far East, including best director, best documentary, audience awards, and others such as the DocAviv International Documentary Film Festival Award and the Gerhald-Klein-Publikums-Preis of the 11th Jewish Film Festival of Berlin and Potsdam.

Lesbianism is generally viewed as forbidden in Orthodox Judaism (see Homosexuality and Judaism). In Jerusalem, a number of Orthodox Jewish lesbians formed a group called OrthoDykes for mutual support and to learn the relevant issues in Jewish law. The film describes lives of three of them. One is Yudit, single and trying to have her same-sex marriage follow the Orthodox rules. Another is Miriam-Ester (pseudonym), who is married to a man and has ten children. She is suppressing her lesbian feelings in order to keep her marriage for religious reasons. Ruth, another married lesbian, keeps her marriage for the same reason, while her husband agrees to her seeing her lover regularly.

See also
 Trembling Before G-d (2001)
 Say Amen (2005) a documentary about a gay man coming out to his Orthodox family
 And Thou Shalt Love (2008), an Israeli short film that examines the difficulties of being both an Orthodox Jew and gay
 Paper Dolls (film)

References

External links
 

2004 films
2004 documentary films
Documentary films about LGBT and Judaism
Documentary films about lesbians
Israeli documentary films
Israeli LGBT-related films
LGBT and Orthodox Judaism
Films set in Jerusalem
Films about Orthodox and Hasidic Jews
2004 LGBT-related films
Anti-Orthodox Judaism sentiment